The Koroglaš Monastery is an abandoned 14th century Serbian Orthodox monastery in the village of Miloševo, Negotin, Serbia, thought to have been founded by Serbian king Stefan Milutin of the Nemanjić dynasty or by Mircea I of Wallachia. Legend says that King of Prilep Prince Marko was buried here after returning from the Battle of Rovine against Mircea I of Wallachia in 1395. The same legend mentioned that Mircea the Elder of Wallachia erected the monastery in memory of Christians killed in the battle of Rovine and in memory of Marko A medieval necropolis of the monastery is partly excavated.

Koroglaš Monastery was declared Monument of Culture of Great Importance in 1979, and it is protected by Republic of Serbia.

See also 
 Monuments of Culture of Great Importance
 Tourism in Serbia

References

 

Serbian Orthodox monasteries in Serbia
14th-century Serbian Orthodox church buildings
Christian monasteries established in the 14th century
Cultural Monuments of Great Importance (Serbia)